Philia is one of the four ancient Greek words for love.

Philia may also refer to:

Philia (Greco-Roman magic), in Greco-Roman religion.
"Philia" (song), a song by Versailles.
Philia (Thrace), town of ancient Thrace.
Philia culture, which existed on Cyprus in the middle and late Bronze Age.
 -philia, a suffix.
Philia (nymph), Greek mythology.
280 Philia, an asteroid named after the previous item.
Philia, a character in the Sword Art Online videogame series.
Philia, a character in A Funny Thing Happened on the Way to the Forum.
Philia, a character in the movie All About Lily Chou-Chou.
"Philia (Prelude)", a song by Flobots from Noenemies.